The United States Air Force's 1st Air Support Operations Group is a combat support unit located at Joint Base Lewis-McChord, Washington. The group provides tactical command and control of airpower assets to the Joint Forces Air Component Commander and Joint Forces Land Component Commander for combat operations.

Mission
The group directs four squadrons operating from 11 locations in Washington, Alaska, Hawaii and Japan. The group provides an Air Support Operations Center and Tactical Air Control Parties to US Army combat units at multiple echelons including United States Army Pacific, I Corps, and nine aviation, airborne, infantry and Stryker brigade combat teams of the 2nd and 25th Infantry Divisions. The 1st Weather Squadron provides operational and staff weather services for Army combat units across the Pacific Command area of responsibility. In addition, they train and maintain combat readiness for worldwide battlefield weather deployments. The groups Air Liaison Officers and Joint Terminal Attack Controllers advise Army commanders and staffs on all aspects of joint airpower employment, integrating and synchronizing close air support, air mobility, and intelligence surveillance and reconnaissance capabilities into strategy, plans, and operations.

Prior to the reformation of the Special Operations Weather career field into the new Special Reconnaissance field, the group operated a small contingent of special operations weather technician airmen.

The group is assigned to the 354th Fighter Wing at Eielson Air Force Base, Alaska. The group is stationed at Joint Base Lewis-McChord, Washington.

Lineage
 Constituted as the 1st Communications Squadron, Air Support on 31 March 1942
 Activated on 23 April 1942
 Redesignated 1st Air Support Communication Squadron on 11 January 1943
 Redesignated 1st Tactical Air Communications Squadron on 1 April 1944
 Inactivated on 29 October 1945
 Disbanded on 8 October 1948
 Reconstituted, redesignated 1st Air Support Group and activated on 15 June 1992
 Redesignated 1st Air Support Operations Group''' on 1 July 1994

Assignments
 Sixth Air Force, 23 April 1942 (attached to 72nd Observation Group)
 Third Air Force, 10 April 1943
 III Ground Air Support Command (later III Air Support Command, III Reconnaissance) Command), c. 19 May 1943 (attached to I Tactical Air Division after c. 8 September 1943)
 I Tactical Air Division, 3 November 1943
 Tenth Air Force, 31 March 1944
 Fourteenth Air Force, 19 April 1945 (attached to XIV Air Force Tactical Air Command [Provisional ] after 21 June 1945)
 Tenth Air Force, 1 August 1945
 Fourteenth Air Force, 3 September 1945 – unknown
 355th Wing, 15 June 1992
 Twelfth Air Force, 1 February 1994
 Thirteenth Air Force, 1 October 2008
 354th Fighter Wing, 28 September 2012 – present

Stations
 Albrook Field, Panama Canal Zone, 23 April 1942
 Birmingham Army Air Base, Alabama, Apr 1943
 Lebanon Army Air Field, Tennessee, 8 September 1943
 Morris Field, North Carolina, 28 November 1943 – 11 February 1944
 Bombay, India, 31 March 1944
 Dinjan, India, 23 April 1944
 Myitkyina, Burma, c. 23 October 1944
 Bhamo, Burma, 15 February 1945
 Lüliang, China, 24 April – September 1945
 Camp Kilmer, New Jersey, 28-29 October 1945
 Fort Lewis (later Joint Base Lewis-McChord), Washington, 15 June 1992 – present

Components
 1st Weather Squadron Fort Lewis, Washington
 3d Air Support Operations Squadron, Joint Base Elmendorf-Richardson, Alasa
 5th Air Support Operations Squadron McChord Air Force Base, Washington
 25th Air Support Operations Squadron Wheeler Army Airfield, Hawaii

References

Notes
 Explanatory notes

 Citations

Bibliography

Air Support Operations 0001
Military units and formations in Washington (state)